Elfi Graf (born Elfriede Sepp 20 November 1952 in Dornbirn, Vorarlberg) is an Austrian Schlagersinger.

Biography
Graf was born in Dornbirn and grew up there with her two siblings. She studied classical music, but did not complete the course. In 1971, she won the talent competition Show Chance and then the schlager singer Gus Backus discovered her in Talentschuppen.

After working as a telephonist, Graf had her first hit in 1974 with Herzen haben keine Fenster, which was rewritten in English as My Melody of Love, which was a hit for Bobby Vinton, and as Don't stay away too long, which was a hit for Peters and Lee. Its Russian version "Люди, улыбнитесь миру" (lyrics by Igor Reznik) has been sung by Edita Piekha since 1983.Herzen haben keine Fenster was chosen by Jan Feddersen in 2008 as number three in a list of 'feelings charts'. Later in 1974, Graf won the Goldene Europa and the silver Bravo-Otto.

Graf had further hits with the songs Am schönsten ist es zu Hause (1976) and Mozartgasse 10 (1977). Her daughter Heidi was born in 1982.

In 1990, Graf competed in the German preliminary round of Grand Prix der Volksmusik with the song Einen Adam, einen Apfel und ein kleines Paradies, and in 1995, she competed in the Austrian round with the song Lieber Leierkastenmann.

Graf lives in Götzis, Vorarlberg and continues to appear in schlager festivals.

Songs
Herzen haben keine Fenster 1973
Wer auf die Liebe warten kann 1974
Orphelias Traum 1974
Er ist ein Schatz 1975
Tango in der Bar von Fernando 1975
Am schönsten ist es zu Hause 1976
Mozartgasse 10 1977
Die Stunde der Wahrheit 1977
Sommerwind 1977
Hoffnungslos verliebt in dich (Hopelessly devoted to you) 1978
Sunday Girl 1979 
Einen Adam, einen Apfel und ein kleines Paradies 1990
Rote Rosen lügen nicht 1992

Discography
CDs (incomplete):
Herzen haben keine Fenster 
Jedes Herz braucht doch nur eine Heimat 1994
Wenn mei Herz a Fensterl hätt''' 1994Versprich mir keinen Regenbogen 1994Eine Hand voll kleiner Träume 1996Aber Dich vergess ich nie 2001Lieder und Geschichten zur WeihnachtszeitIch hör dir zu'' 2006

References

External links

1952 births
Living people
People from Dornbirn
20th-century Austrian women singers
Schlager musicians